This is a list of the extreme points of Bhutan.

Country extreme points

Latitude and longitude 
 North:
 disputed: Gasa District-China border.  
 undisputed: Gasa District-China border, near Jigme Dorji National Park. 
 South: Sarpang District-Assam border. 
 West: Samtse District-Sikkim border, near Neora Valley National Park in India. 
 East: Trashigang District-Arunachal Pradesh border, near Sakteng Wildlife Sanctuary.

Altitude
Gangkhar Puensum is located in northwestern Bhutan along the borders of Gasa District, Wangdue Phodrang District, and China. 
The lowest point is located in eastern Sarpang District where the Mangde Chhu river crosses into India (Assam) near the Indian town of Manas.

Highest attainable by transportation

Highest geographical features

Lake:  
River:

See also 
Extreme points of Earth
Extreme points of Afro-Eurasia
Extreme points of Eurasia
Extreme points of Asia
 Geography of Bhutan

Geography of Bhutan
Bhutan